In Greek mythology, Amphimachus (Ancient Greek: Ἀμφίμαχος derived from ἀμφί amphi "on both sides, in all directions, surrounding" and μαχη mache "battle") was a name attributed to multiple individuals.
 Amphimachus, son of Cteatus and Theronice.
 Amphimachus of Caria, son of Nomion and brother of Nastes.
 Amphimachus, son of Electryon and Anaxo.
 Amphimachus, son of Polyxenus and king of Elis.
 Amphimachus, a Greek warrior in the Trojan War, and one of the men hidden inside the Trojan horse.
 Amphimachus, one of the Suitors of Penelope who came from Dulichium along with other 56 wooers. Amphimachus, with the other suitors, was slain by Odysseus with the aid of Eumaeus, Philoetius, and Telemachus.
 Amphimachus, also one of the Suitors of Penelope from Ithaca with 11 other wooers. He suffered the same fate as his above namesake.

Notes

References 
 Apollodorus, The Library with an English Translation by Sir James George Frazer, F.B.A., F.R.S. in 2 Volumes, Cambridge, MA, Harvard University Press; London, William Heinemann Ltd. 1921. ISBN 0-674-99135-4. Online version at the Perseus Digital Library.
 Homer, The Iliad with an English Translation by A.T. Murray, Ph.D. in two volumes. Cambridge, MA., Harvard University Press; London, William Heinemann, Ltd. 1924. . Online version at the Perseus Digital Library.
 Homer, The Odyssey with an English Translation by A.T. Murray, PH.D. in two volumes. Cambridge, MA., Harvard University Press; London, William Heinemann, Ltd. 1919. . Online version at the Perseus Digital Library.
 Pausanias, Description of Greece with an English Translation by W.H.S. Jones, Litt.D., and H.A. Ormerod, M.A., in 4 Volumes. Cambridge, MA, Harvard University Press; London, William Heinemann Ltd. 1918. . Online version at the Perseus Digital Library.
 Quintus Smyrnaeus, Quintus Smyrnaeus: The Fall of Troy, translated by A.S. Way, Cambridge, Massachusetts, Harvard University Press, 1913. Internet Archive.

Achaeans (Homer)
People of the Trojan War
Suitors of Penelope
Ithacan characters in Greek mythology